Mota'ain, also spelled Motain, Mota'in or Mota Ain, is a hamlet in the Silawan village (desa), East Tasifeto district (kecamatan), Belu Regency, East Nusa Tenggara, Indonesia.

A major border crossing checkpoint with customs, immigration and quarantine services between Indonesia and East Timor, called the Mota'ain Border Crossing Checkpoint, is located in the village. The corresponding checkpoint on the East Timor side is Batugade.

Mota'ain is on main road between Kupang, 290 km to the southwest, and Dili which is 113 km to the east. The nearest major city is Atambua, the capital of Belu Regency. The port of Atapupu is located 5 km to the west.

Border Crossing
The Mota'ain Border Crossing Checkpoint (Indonesian: Pos Lintas Batas Negara) is a modern complex providing customs, immigration and quarantine service for pedestrian and vehicular traffic crossing between East Timor and Indonesia. The new complex, which replaced the earlier smaller facility which was set up when East Timor separated from Indonesia, was officially opened by Indonesian president Joko Widodo on 28 December 2016. Construction of the new checkpoint complex, which is located on a  site, began in 2015 and cost 82 billion rupiah.

Shooting Incident of 1999
On 10 October 1999, International Force East Timor (INTERFET) troops - a platoon from 2 RAR - patrolling along the main road were shot at as they were approaching the border bridge at Mota'ain while within East Timor territory. Reports stated that the shots were fired by either pro-Indonesian militia or the Indonesian police. The INTERFET troops returned fire in the ensuing clash. Reports stated that in a meeting between the Indonesian army and INTERFET following the incident established that the INTERFET troops were still about 100 metres inside East Timor territory when they were fired upon.

Gallery

References

External links
 

Populated places in East Nusa Tenggara
East Timor–Indonesia border crossings